Jean A. Turnage (March 10, 1926 – September 27, 2015) was the chief justice of the Montana Supreme Court from 1985 until 2000.

He was born in St. Ignatius, Montana. He served in the United States Army Air Corps after high school. He studied on the G.I. Bill at Montana State University, predecessor of the University of Montana.

In 1952, he became Lake County's attorney. He served two years in the Montana House of Representatives and  20 years in the Montana State Senate including as senate president in 1981 session.

He ran successfully for Chief Justice of the Montana Supreme Court in 1984, serving two terms before retiring in January 2001.

Turnage was an enrolled member of the Confederated Salish and Kootenai Tribes He had two children.

References

Justices of the Montana Supreme Court
Chief Justices of the Montana Supreme Court
1926 births
2015 deaths
People from St. Ignatius, Montana
University of Montana alumni
Members of the Montana House of Representatives
Montana state senators
20th-century American judges